The Buckeye Furnace Covered Bridge, is a covered bridge located in Buckeye, Milton Township, Jackson County, Ohio.  It was listed on the National Register of Historic Places in 1975.

Built in 1872, it is a Smith truss design bridge. It was named after the Buckeye Furnace, built 10 years prior, and provided access to the company town of Buckeye.  The bridge continues to serve the region, even long after the furnace shut down in 1894 and the surrounding village disappeared.

References

External links

Buckeye Furnace Covered Bridge at Bridges & Tunnels

Covered bridges in Ohio
National Register of Historic Places in Jackson County, Ohio
Bridges completed in 1872
1872 establishments in Ohio